Denny Bray Guka (born 1961 or 1962) is a former Anglican Papua New Guinean priest and bishop who served as Bishop of Port Moresby in the Anglican Church of Papua New Guinea from 24 May 2015 to 10 August 2019. On 10 August 2019 he was removed from holy orders by the Church's House of Bishops after being found guilty of misconduct by the Church Provincial Court of the Anglican Church of Papua New Guinea.

References

1960s births
Living people
Year of birth uncertain

21st-century Anglican bishops in Oceania
Papua New Guinean bishops
Anglican bishops of Port Moresby